Warrabah is a national park in New South Wales, Australia,  north of Sydney. It is situated west of Kingstown and east of Split Rock Dam.

The major feature of the park is the Namoi River which carves a  gorge that drops . Activities in the park include canoeing, li-loing, rock climbing and bush walking. The average elevation of the terrain is 759 meters.

Over 120 bird species have been spotted here. Among others there are robins, rosellas and cockatoos to wedge-tailed eagles and wrens.

See also
 Protected areas of New South Wales

References

National parks of New South Wales
Protected areas established in 1984
1984 establishments in Australia